The Osgodby Formation is a geologic formation in England. It comprises rocks and fossils dating from the Callovian age of the Jurassic period.

See also

 List of fossiliferous stratigraphic units in England

References

 

Jurassic England
Callovian Stage
Jurassic System of Europe